Mystery Submarine is a 1963 British war film directed by C. M. Pennington-Richards and starring Edward Judd, James Robertson Justice and Laurence Payne. A captured German submarine is used by the Royal Navy to trick a German force aiming to intercept a supply convoy. The film is based on a play by Jon Manchip White.

Plot

U-153 is damaged during air attack in the Atlantic, and its crew abandon ship to escape chlorine gas now leaking from its battery cells. Her commanding officer is overcome by fumes before he can jettison the ship's papers. Due to the intelligence windfall that this represents, the submarine is taken by a British prize crew to be examined and inspected (in much the same manner that befell the real German U-boat later renamed HMS Graph ).

It is not long before British intelligence suggest a new use for the submarine as a Trojan Horse. A picked crew of volunteers led by Commander Tarlton (Edward Judd) take the U-153 back to war, to intercept and disable a German Wolf-pack; in this they succeed, even sinking the Wolf-pack leader in their subsequent escape.

Her mission accomplished the U-153 is attacked and sunk by a British Frigate whose crew is oblivious to the submarine's mission or identity. Commander Tarlton orders his men to abandon ship, getting his crew off intact before she goes down. Their rescuers are astonished to learn that not only are the men they recover from the sea all British, but by attacking they have just sunk one of ‘His Majesty’s submarines…’

Cast
 Edward Judd - Lieutenant Commander Tarlton
 James Robertson Justice - Rear Admiral Rainbird
 Laurence Payne - Lieutenant Seaton
 Joachim Fuchsberger - Commander Scheffler
 Arthur O'Sullivan - Mike Fitzgerald
 Albert Lieven - Captain Neymarck
 Robert Flemyng - Vice Admiral Sir James Carver
 Richard Carpenter - Lieutenant Haskins
 Richard Thorp - Lieutenant Chatterton
 Jeremy Hawk - Admiral Saintsbury
 Robert Brown - Coxswain Drage
 Frederick Jaeger - Lieutenant Hence
 George Mikell - Lieutenant Remer
 Peter Myers - Telegraphist Packshaw
 Leslie Randall - Leading Seaman Donnithorne
 Ewen Solon - Lieutenant Commander Kirklees
 Nigel Green - Chief Lovejoy

References

External links

1963 films
British war drama films
World War II submarine films
Royal Navy in World War II films
British films based on plays
British Lion Films films
Films directed by C. M. Pennington-Richards
Films scored by Clifton Parker
1960s English-language films
British World War II films
1960s British films